The John Battaglia Memorial Stakes is a race for thoroughbred horses held in early March at Turfway Park.  The race is open to three-year-olds willing to race one and one-sixteenth miles on the Tapeta surface. The race is an ungraded stakes with a current purse of $75,000.

Begun in 1982, the race is a prep to the Jeff Ruby Steaks.

John Battaglia was the former general manager of the old Latonia Race Track (now Turfway).  He also was the general manager of Miles Park (race track) in Louisville, Kentucky.  His son, Mike Battaglia, served as the track announcer at Turfway until early 2016 and was also a racing analyst for NBC Sports.

Winners

The following list are the winners of the race. 

 2023 - Congruent
 2022 - Tiz The Bomb
 2021 - Hush of a Storm
 2020 - Invador
 2019 - Somelikeithotbrown
 2018 - Magicalmeister
 2017 - It's Your Nickel
 2016 - Surgical Strike
 2015 - Royal Son
 2014 - Solitary Ranger
 2013 - General Election
 2012 - State of Play 
 2011 - Positive Response 
 2010 - Vow to Wager 
 2009 - Proceed Bee 
 2008 - Absolutely Cindy (filly)
 2007 - Catman Running 
 2006 - Laity 
 2005 - Magna Graduate 
 2004 - Silver Minister 
 2003 - Champali 
 2002 - Request For Parole 
 2001 - Bonnie Scot 
 2000 - Nature
 1999 - K One King
 1998 - Daniel My Brother
 1997 - Concerto 
 1996 - Beefchopper
 1995 - Car Dealer
 1994 - Mahogany Hall
 1993 - Fafa Lemos
 1992 - Quiet Enjoyment 
 1991 - Discover
 1990 - Private School
 1989 - Revive
 1988 - Glory Affair
 1987 - Lt. Lao (filly)
 1986 - Blanford Park
 1985 - Aggie's Best
 1984 - Magic Ten
 1983 - Runs Like A Prince 
 1982 - Baraco 

The 2021 edition of the race was made a points race on the 2021 Road to the Kentucky Derby.

References

Turfway Park official site

Ungraded stakes races in the United States
Triple Crown Prep Races
Turfway Park horse races
Recurring sporting events established in 1982
1982 establishments in Kentucky